Ashish Kumar ojhaa may refer to:

 Ashish Kumar (actor), Indian actor and director
 Ashish Kumar (boxer) (born 1994), Indian amateur boxer
 Ashish Kumar (cricketer) (born 1988), Indian cricketer
 Ashish Kumar (gymnast) (born 1990), Indian gymnast
 Ashish Kumar Ballal (born 1970), Indian field hockey player
 Ashish Kumar Chauhan (born 1968), Indian business executive
 Ashish Kumar Louho (1937–1994), Bangladeshi actor
 Ashish Kumar Saha, Indian politician from Tripura
 Ashish Kumar Singh, Indian politician from Uttar Pradesh
 Ashish Kumar Yadav (born 1984), Indian politician